The following is a list of awards and nominations received by Canadian-American actress and producer Sandra Oh. Among her accolades, she received two Golden Globe Awards and four Screen Actors Guild Awards, as well as nominations for thirteen Primetime Emmy Awards.

Major associations

BAFTA Awards

Critics' Choice Awards

Golden Globe Awards

Primetime Emmy Awards

Screen Actors Guild Awards

Other awards

Boston Society of Film Critics Awards

CableACE Awards

Dorian Awards

Festival International de Programmes Audiovisuels

Gemini Awards

Genie Awards

Gold Derby Awards

Governor General's Performing Arts Awards

Gracie Awards

Hollywood Reel Independent Film Festival

Kids' Choice Awards

Monte-Carlo TV Festival

MTV Movie & TV Awards

NAACP Image Awards

People's Choice Awards

Phoenix Film Critics Society Awards

Satellite Awards

Saturn Awards

Television Critics Association Awards

References 

Lists of awards received by American actor
Lists of awards received by Canadian actor